Mount Wickersham is a  elevation mountain summit located  east of Palmer, in the northern Chugach Mountains of the U.S. state of Alaska. This landmark of the Matanuska Valley is set midway between Anchorage and Glennallen, at mile 101 of the Glenn Highway. The mountain was named in 1960 by Senator Bob Bartlett and Secretary of the Interior Fred A. Seaton, to remember James Wickersham (1857–1939), attorney, District Judge, and Territorial Delegate to Congress from Alaska. In June 1903, Wickersham was also leader of the (unsuccessful) first attempt to climb Denali (Mount McKinley at that time). His attempt was stymied by steep cliffs which also now bear his name, Wickersham Wall.

Climate

Based on the Köppen climate classification, Mount Wickersham is located in a subarctic climate zone with long, cold, snowy winters, and mild summers. Weather systems coming off the Gulf of Alaska are forced upwards by the Chugach Mountains (orographic lift), causing heavy precipitation in the form of rainfall and snowfall. Winter temperatures can drop below −20 °C with wind chill factors below −30 °C. The months May through June offer the most favorable weather for climbing or viewing Mount Wickersham. Precipitation runoff from the mountain drains into tributaries of the Matanuska River.

See also

Matanuska Formation
Geography of Alaska

References

External links
 Weather forecast: Mount Wickersham
 Commons photo: Wickersham Wall

Wickersham
Wickersham
Wickersham
North American 2000 m summits